R v Secretary of State for Foreign and Commonwealth Affairs, ex p Bancoult (No 1)  [2000] EWHC Admin 413  was a 2000 legal case in which Olivier Bancoult sought a judicial review of the ordinance which allowed the Chaggosian people to be forcibly removed from their homeland. The Divisional Court ruled that the ordinance that allowed the removal was "ultra vires" as the power to legislate for "peace, order and good governance" of the territory did not include a power to expel the inhabitants. However, in R v Secretary of State for Foreign and Commonwealth Affairs, ex p Bancoult (No 2) this decision was overturned by the House of Lords in a controversial 3-2 judgment.

References

2000 in England
Chagos Archipelago sovereignty dispute
United Kingdom administrative case law
2000 in case law
2000 in British law
High Court of Justice cases